Tapa Airfield  is an unused air base in Estonia located  southwest of Tapa. During the Cold War it was home to the 656th Fighter Aviation Regiment PVO (IAP PVO). For most of the time the regiment was part of the 14th Air Defence Division of the 6th Air Defence Army.

Tapa's interceptor regiment initially operated the Mikoyan-Gurevich MiG-17 (ASCC: Fresco) then the Sukhoi Su-9 (ASCC: Fishpot) in the 1960s and 1970s.  This aircraft was replaced in 1978 with the Mikoyan-Gurevich MiG-23M (ASCC: Flogger-B).

In 1987, interceptor aircraft were dispatched from Tapa to intercept Mathias Rust's Cessna 172 in a famous Cold War incident to prevent a recurrence the 384th Independent Helicopter Squadron (384 OVE) was deployed here with the Mil Mi-24P (ASCC: Hind-F) between 1989 and 1992.

See also
 Tapa Army Base
 List of airports in Estonia

References

Soviet Air Force bases
Military installations of Estonia
Soviet Air Defence Force bases
Airports in Estonia
Tapa, Estonia
Buildings and structures in Lääne-Viru County